The 2017–18 Calgary Flames season was their 38th season in Calgary, and the 46th season for the National Hockey League franchise that was established on June 6, 1972. The Flames missed the playoffs for the seventh time in their last nine seasons.

Standings

Schedule and results

Pre-season
The pre-season schedule was released on June 15, 2017. Before the start of pre-season games, the Flames' rookies and prospects participated in the annual Young Stars Classic tournament.

Regular season
The regular season schedule was published on June 22, 2017.

Player statistics

Skaters

Goaltenders

†Denotes player spent time with another team before joining the Flames. Stats reflect time with the Flames only.
‡Traded mid-season
Bold/italics denotes franchise record

Awards and honours

Milestones

Transactions

Player signings

Trades

Additions and subtractions

Draft picks

Below are the Calgary Flames' selections at the 2017 NHL Entry Draft, which was held on June 23 and 24, 2017 at the United Center in Chicago.

References

Calgary Flames seasons
Calgary Flames
Calgary